The Tati language (Tati: , Tâti Zobun) is a Northwestern Iranian language spoken by the Tat people of Iran which is closely related to other languages such as Talysh, Mazandarani and Gilaki. It is also, for the most part, mutually intelligible with Persian. Tats are a subgroup of Northwestern Iranians.

Old Azari

Some sources use the term old Azari/Azeri to refer to the Tati language as it was spoken in the region before the spread of Turkic languages (see Ancient Azari language), and is now only spoken by different rural communities in Iranian Azerbaijan (such as villages in Harzanabad area, villages around Khalkhal and Ardabil), and also in Zanjan and Qazvin provinces.

Tati language structure
In any language, roots and verb affixes constitute the most basic and important components of a language. The root is an element included in all the words of a lexical family and carries the basic meaning of those lexical items. A verb affix is an element added to the root to form a new meaning.
In many new Iranian languages, verb affixes have been left almost unnoticed, and it will be possible, by the act of deriving roots, to clear up most of their structural and semantic ambiguities. Unlike the root, verb affixes can be easily identified and described. In many languages, verb affixes act as the base of verb formation and are often derived from a limited number of roots. Tati, Talysh, Mazandarani and Gilaki languages belong to North-western Iranian languages currently spoken along the coast of Caspian Sea. These languages which enjoy many old linguistic elements have not been duly studied from a linguistic perspective.

In the field of phonetics Tati is similar to the rest of the north-western Iranian languages: it is distinguished by the persistence of Iranian *z, *s, *y-, * v- against the south-western d, h, j-, b-; development  < * j,  against the south-west z, and the preservation of intervocalic and postvocalic *r and even, for a number of dialects, development rhotacism.

In the field of morphology, Tati is less analytical in structure than the south-western Iranian languages. Having lost the ancient foundations of classes and verb, tati preserved case (two case: direct, or subjective, and oblique). It is a gender-neutral language except in some name and verb formations.

Ergative in Tati language
Tati is an ergative language, i.e. "with transitive verbs the subject/agent of the verb is expressed by the direct case in the present tenses, but by the oblique in the past tenses, whereas the direct object/patient in the present tenses is expressed by the oblique, but by the direct in the past".Khalkhali is one of the Tati dialects spoken in Shahrood and Xorsh-rostam districts of Khalkhal. Khalkhali Tati is distinguished from other dialects producing ergative structures, because of the adherence of verb to semantic object, in number, person and specially in gender. Meanwhile, according to some evidence in this dialect, apart from past transitive verbs, some intransitive verbs are influenced by the ergative structure.

Phonology

Consonants
The phonology is based on the Southern Tati dialects:

The following sounds // may allophonically range to the sounds .

Vowels

Dialects
Tati has four main dialects:
 South of Qazvin province (Tākestāni, Eshtehārdi, Chāli, Dānesfāni, Esfarvarini, Ebrāhim-ābādi, Sagz-ābādi)
 Ardabil province (Khalkhāli)
 Alborz mountains range (Damāvandi). This dialect was, probably, used to be spoken around the northern part of Tehran City.
 North Khorasan province (Khorāsāni)

Comparison of various Tati dialects

Other Tati dialects are Vafsi, Harzandi, Kho'ini, and Kiliti Eshtehardi.

Vafsi Tati
Vafsi is a dialect of Tati language spoken in the Vafs village and surrounding area in the Markazi province of Iran. The dialects of the Tafresh region share many features with the Central Plateau dialects; however, their lexical inventory has many items in common with the Talysh subgroup.

Vafsi has six short vowel phonemes, five long vowel phonemes and two nasal vowel phonemes. The consonant inventory is basically the same as in Persian.
Nouns are inflected for gender (masculine, feminine), number (singular, plural) and case (direct, oblique).

The oblique case marks the possessor (preceding the head noun), the definite direct object, nouns governed by a preposition, and the subject of transitive verbs in the past tense.
Personal pronouns are inflected for number (singular, plural) and case (direct, oblique).
A set of enclitic pronouns is used to indicate the agent of transitive verbs in the past tenses.

There are two demonstrative pronouns: one for near deixis, one for remote deixis.
The use of the Persian ezafe construction is spreading; however, there is also a native possessive construction, consisting of the possessor (unmarked or marked by the oblique case) preceding the head noun.

The verbal inflection is based on two stems: present and past stem. Person and number are indicated personal suffixes attached to the stem. In the transitive past tense the verb consists of the bare past stem and personal concord with the subject is provided by enclitic pronouns following the stem or a constituent preceding the verb. Two modal prefixes are used to convey modal and aspectual information. The past participle is employed in the formation of compound tenses.

Vafsi is a split ergative language: Split ergativity means that a language has in one domain accusative morphosyntax and in another domain ergative morphosyntax. In Vafsi the present tense is structured the accusative way and the past tense is structured the ergative way. Accusative morphosyntax means that in a language subjects of intransitive and transitive verbs are treated the same way and direct objects are treated another way. Ergative morphosyntax means that in a language subjects of intransitive verbs and direct objects are treated one way and subjects of transitive verbs are treated another way.

In the Vafsi past tense subjects of intransitive verbs and direct objects are marked by the direct case whereas subjects of transitive verbs are marked by the oblique case. This feature characterizes the Vafsi past tense as ergative.

The unmarked order of constituents is SOV like in most other Iranian languages.

Harzandi Tati

Harzani is considered an endangered language with a little less than 30,000 speakers in present day. Its speakers principally reside in the rural district of Harzand, particularly in the village known as Galin Qayah/Kohriz. Harzani is also present in the neighboring villages of Babratein and Dash Harzand.

As of now, Harzani has not been formally recognized by the Islamic Republic of Iran, and thus receives no government support.

Like other languages and dialects of the Iranian language family, Harzani follows a subject–object–verb (SOV) word order. It has nine vowels, and shares a consonant inventory with Persian. It further exhibits a split-ergative case system: its present tense is structured to follow nominative-accusative patterning, while its past tense follows ergative-absolutive.

One characteristic that distinguishes Harzani from related Northwestern Iranian languages is its change from an intervocalic /d/ to an /r/. It also has a tendency to lengthen its vowels. For instance, it has the closed vowel /oe/.

Nouns and pronouns in Harzani do not reflect grammatical gender, but they do express case. Nouns, in particular, encode two cases: direct and oblique case, the first of which is not rendered morphologically, but the second is by attaching a suffix. Meanwhile, personal pronouns have three cases: direct, oblique, and possessive.

Verbs in Harzani are inflected for present tense and past tense. Information concerning person and number is reflected in suffixes that attach to these two verb stems. Modal and aspectual information is expressed using prefixes.

Kho'ini Tati

The Xoini verbal system follows the general pattern found in other Tati dialects. However, the dialect has its own special characteristics such as continuous present which is formed by the past stem, a preverb shift, and the use of connective sounds. The dialect is in danger of extinction.

Nouns have two cases: direct and oblique. Contrary to the often case in Persian, adjective is not Post-positive.

The suffixes may be attached to the verb; the agent of the verb in an ergative construction; an adverb; a prepositional or postpositional phrase; and in a compound verb to its nominal Complement.

The same set of endings is used for the present and the subjunctive. The endings of the preterit and the present perfect are basically the enclitic present forms of the verb 'to be' (*ah-, here called base one). For pluperfect and subjunctive perfect the freestanding auxiliary verb 'to be' (*bav-, here called base two) is utilized. There is no ending for singular imperative and it is -ân for plural. For the inflections of "to be" see "Auxiliary inflection" below.

The past and present stems are irregular and shaped by historical developments, e.g.: wuj- / wut- (to say); xaraš-/xarat- (to sell); taj-/tat- (to run). However, in many verbs the past stem is built on the present stem by adding -(e)st; e.g.: brem- → bremest- (to weep).

The imperative is formed by the modal prefix be- if the verb contains no preverb, plus the present stem and without ending in the singular and with -ân in the plural. be- is often changed to bi-, bo- or bu- according to the situation, and appears as b- before a vowel of a verbal stem.

Kiliti Tati
Kiliti is a Tati dialect of Azerbaijan that is closely related to Talysh. It is spoken in the villages around Kilit, located 12 kilometers southwest from the city of Ordubad in a district with the same name of Nakhchivan in Azerbaijan.

Tati and Talysh
Tati and Talysh are Northwestern Iranian languages which are closely related. Although Talysh and Tati are two languages that have affected each other in various levels, the degree of this effect in different places are not the same. In fact, the very closeness of the two languages has been a major reason for impossibility of drawing clear borderlines between them. It happens that Tati varieties can be seen in the heart of Talysh districts, or Talysh varieties are found in the center of Tati districts. This claim is supported by focusing on linguistic characteristics of Tati and Talysh, the history of the interrelation between the two languages, geographical parameters of the area, as well as the phonological, morphological, and lexical examples.

Comparison of Talysh and various Tati dialects

Distribution
Ardabil Province:
Khalkhal County:
Asbu, Derav, Kolur, Kehel, Askestan, Shal, Diz, Gandomabad, Karin, Lerd, Gilavan, Karnaq, Kajal (fa). (Kajali, Khoresh Rostam)
Namin County:
Tarom, Anbaran, Minabad, Mirzanaq, Kolosh, Sarvabad, Pilehrud (fa), Jeyd, Towlash, Upper Anbaran.
East Azerbaijan Province:
Heris County:
Chay Kandi.
Marand County:
Harzand-e Atiq, Harzand-e Jadid, Galin Qayah. (Harzandi)
Kaleybar County:
Kalasur, Khunirud, Damirchi.
Varzaqan County:
Karangan. (Gozarkhani, Karingani)
Nakhchivan Autonomous Republic:
Ordubad Rayon:
Kilit. (Kiliti)
Alborz Province:
Karaj County:
Asara, Jey, Azadbar, Abharak, Adaran, Arangeh, Avizar, Ayegan, Bagh-e Pir, Purkan, Tekyeh-e Sepahsalar, Jurab, Charan, Hasanak Dar, Khvares, Khur, Khuzankola, Dardeh, Darvan, Sorkheh Darreh, Sar Ziarat, Sarv Dar, Siah Kalan, Sijan, Sira, Shelnak, Shahrestanak, Kalvan, Kalha, Kondor, Kushk-e Bala, Kohneh Deh, Kiasar, Kiasarlat, Garmab, Gasil, Gashnadar, Laniz, Leylestan, Malek Faliz, Murud, Meydanak, Nesa, Nasht-e Rud, Nowjan, Varangeh Rud, Varian, Varzan, Velayat Rud, Valeh, Vineh. (Karaji (fa))
Eshtehard County:
Sehhatabad, Ahmadabad, Jafarabad, Mehdiabad, Fardabad, Mokhtarabad, Abdollahabad, Kushkabad, Palangabad, Moradabad, Morad Tappeh, Qezel Hesar, Rahmanieh, Oposhteh, Gong, Jaru, Nekujar, Bujafar.
Taleqan County. (Taleqani (fa))
Tehran Province:
Damavand County:
Kilan, Absard.
Markazi Province:
Zarandieh County:
Alvir, Vidar. (Alviri-Vidari)
Komijan County:
Vafs, Chehreqan, Farak, Gurchan. (Vafsi)
Qazvin Province:
Qazvin County:
Kuchenan, Andaj, Alulak, Masoudabad, Zereshk, Voshteh, Taskin, Dastjerd-e Olya, Zarabad, Sapuhin, Mushqin, Vartavan, Halarud, Zanasuj, Avirak, Durchak, Suteh Kosh, Keshabad-e Olya, Keshabad-e Sofla, Asbmard (fa), Dikin, Soleymanabad, Garmarud-e Sofla. (Maraghei, Shahrudi)
Takestan County:
Takestan, Esfarvarin, Qarqasin.
Buin Zahra County:
Danesfahan, Shal, Sagzabad, Ebrahimabad, Kharuzan, Khuznin, Khiaraj.
Abyek County, Ziaran, Samghabad, Tikhor, Tudaran, Aqchari, Khuznan, Jazmeh, Atanak, Qazi Kalayeh, Ebrahimabad, Kahvan, Daral Sarvar, Miankuh, Kazlak, Yuj, Razjerd, Shinqar, Ardabilak, Mianbar. (Razajerdi)
Zanjan Province:
Zanjan County:
Sheykh Jaber.
Ijrud County:
Khoein, Saidabad-e Sofla, Sefid Kamar, Halab, Garneh. (Khoeini)
Tarom County.
Siyahvarud, Bandargah, Quhijan, Charazeh, Nukian, Hezarrud (fa).
Gilan Province:
Rudbar County:
Eskabon, Anbuh, Aineh Deh, Bivarzin, Pa Rudbar, Pakdeh, Damash, Karamak-e Bala, Kalisham, Layeh, Miankushk (fa), Naveh, Now Deh, Viyeh, Yeknam.
Semnan Province:
Garmsar County:
Eyvanki.
North Khorasan Province:
Esfarayen County:
Adkan, Bidvaz.
Bojnord County:
Qaleh-ye Mohammadi, Gifan-e Pain, Gifan-e Bala, Mianzu, Rezqaneh.
Jajarm County:
Sankhvast, Do Borjeh, Tabar, Korf, Kharashah, Ghamiteh, Jorbat, Ark, Anduqan, Eslamabad (fa).
Shirvan County:
Barzali, Borzolabad Golian.

See also
 Alviri-Vidari language
 Tat people (Iran)
 northwestern Iranian languages

References

External links
 Iranica entry on Eshtehārdi, one of Tati dialects
 Windfuhr: New West Iranian
 Grammar of the Talysh language in Russian

Northwestern Iranian languages
Endangered languages of Iran
Caspian languages